Cumulus is a global association of higher education institutions in the fields of art, design and media. Currently, there are 350 members from 60 countries.

Cumulus was founded in 1990 by the Aalto University School of Arts, Design and Architecture in Finland and the Royal College of Art in London in cooperation with the Danish Design School, Gerrit Rietvelt Academy, University of Duisburg-Essen and University of Applied Arts Vienna. The network was established to coordinate collaboration between the schools, student and teacher exchange within the European Union Erasmus programme. The network was transferred to Cumulus Association in 2001.

In the last 30 years, Cumulus has become a global association that organises biannual conferences and initiates projects and workshops with member institutions. The aim is to improve the quality of art, design and media education and to help students, professors and other faculty members to work internationally. In addition to academic collaboration, Cumulus facilitates collaboration with businesses, public institutions and governments with an interest in art and design education and research.

To stimulate design actions, projects and research leading to a more sustainable society, Cumulus representatives signed the Kyoto Design Declaration in March 2008. To implement the ideals of the Declaration, the Cumulus Green award was established. Cumulus Green is an international award focused on cultivating and leading global cultures, societies and industries towards more ecological and responsible solutions.

References 

 Organizations established in 1990